= Andriy Semyankiv =

Ukrainian writer

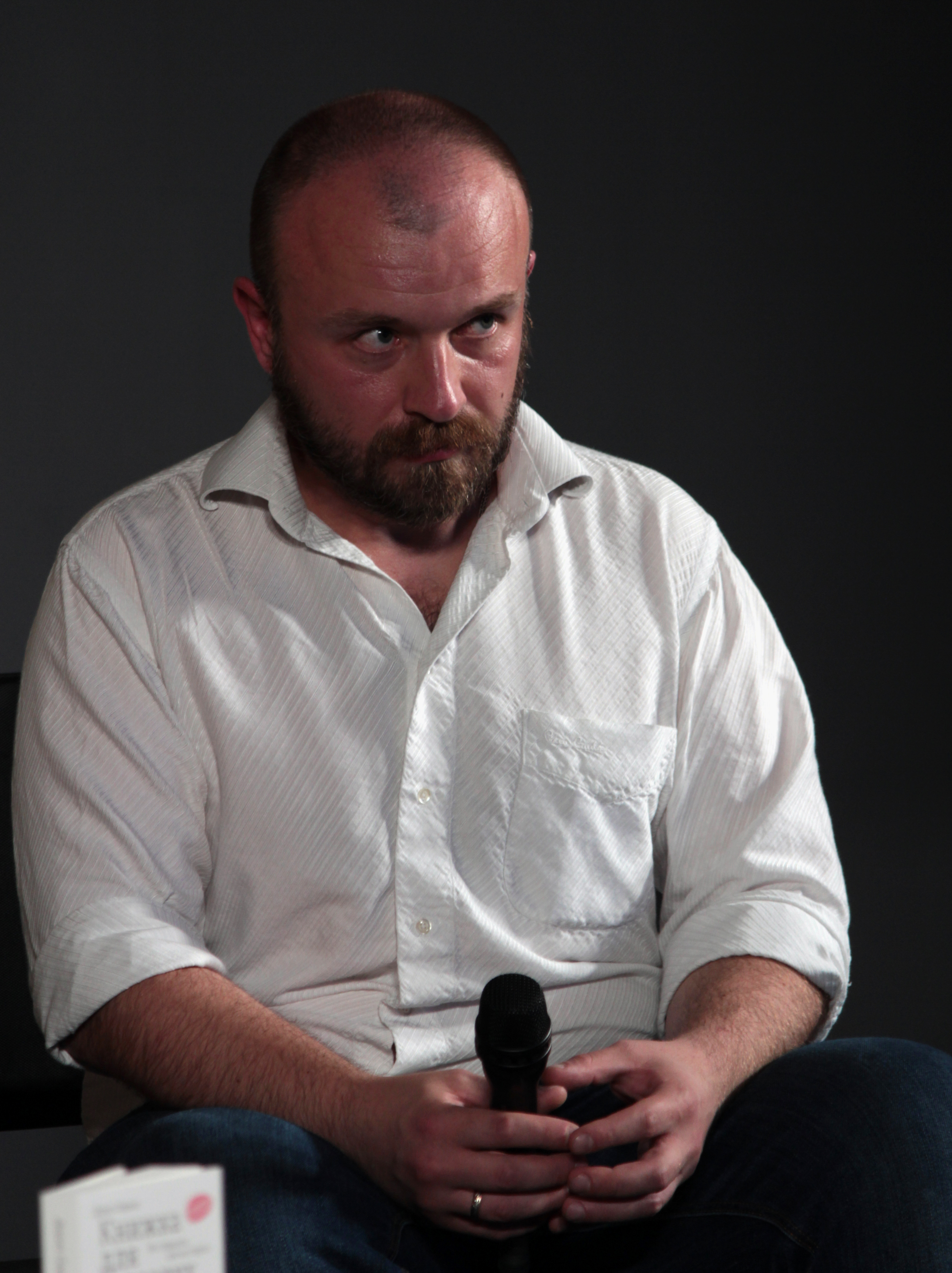
Andrii Semiankiv

Andrii Semiankiv (Ukrainian: Андрій Сем'янків) is a Ukrainian writer. In December 2022, he won BBC News' Ukraine Book Award for his medical thriller, Dancing with bones. He received the news while on the frontlines of the Russian invasion of Ukraine, where he served as a field medic.
