= Dancing with bones =

2022 novel by Andriy Semyankiv

Dancing with Bones
- Author: Andriy Semyankiv
- Original title: Танці з кістками
- Language: Ukrainian
- Genre: Medical thriller
- Publisher: Vikhola
- Publication date: 2022
- Publication place: Ukraine
- Pages: 368
- ISBN: 978-617-7960-67-5

Dancing with Bones (Ukrainian: Танці з кістками, romanized: Tantsi z kistkamy, lit. 'Dancing with Bones') is a 2022 Ukrainian novel by writer and physician Andriy Semyankiv, who is also known by the pen name MED GOblin. It was published by Vikhola. It won the BBC News Ukraine Book of the Year award in 2022.
